The Address Downtown,  formerly The Address Downtown Dubai,  is a 63-story,   supertall hotel and residential skyscraper in the Burj Dubai Development Area of Dubai, United Arab Emirates. It was built by Emaar Properties.

Overview
The tower is the twenty-second tallest building in Dubai. It is a tall structure within the massive development named Downtown Dubai, which includes the centerpiece super-tall building, the Burj Khalifa.  The tower was topped out in April 2008, and was then the sixth tallest building in Dubai.  The AED845 million tower was completed in September 2008.

The five-star hotel and residential compound features 196 rooms and 626 serviced apartments. Thanks to its proximity to Burj Khalifa and The Dubai Fountain these hotels are well mentioned among the most beautiful hotel views in Dubai.

2015 fire
Around 21:00 GST on 31 December 2015, a fire broke out on the 20th floor of the building. The floor where the fire is thought to have begun hosts residential suites. The nearby Dubai Mall was also evacuated as a precaution.

Dubai's Media Office said the fire began on a 20th-floor terrace. Explosions of unknown origin were heard as the fire spread to other parts of the building. Then, debris fell from the building and dark plumes of smoke were seen emanating from the skyscraper. Commenting on the speed with which the fire spread, Jonathan Gilliam, a CNN law-enforcement analyst, said, "This is looking absolutely horrific. This is spreading very rapidly."

A representative of Dubai Civil Defence said four separate teams of firefighters had fought the blaze.  Once the fire was contained, the plan was to ensure that the fire did not spread by implementing cooling procedures, and to search for any stranded individuals, according to Dubai Police Chief, Major-General Khamis Mattar Al Mazeina.

According to the Dubai Media Office, 14 people were slightly injured and one was moderately injured. One person had a heart attack during the evacuation.

Photographer Dennis Mallari was setting up to photograph the Dubai fireworks when he became trapped on a balcony on the 48th floor of the hotel, 10 meters away from the blaze.  He sent text messages alerting the authorities to his emergency, sought help by Facebook posts, and filmed the encroaching fire, and eventually tied a rope around himself to a nearby window-cleaning platform and hung off a balcony before being rescued.

Those who sustained smoke inhalation and minor injuries were treated by 20 doctors and 50 nurses from the Dubai Health Authority at the site, according to Al Mazeina. Director-General of Dubai Civil Defence, Major General Rashid Thani Rashid Al Matroushi, said that all of the hotel residents were evacuated, none of the injured were children, and that fire "broke out only in the external interface and the majority of the fire did not make it to the inside." Several people at the site complained that neither the fire alarm nor the sprinkler system activated during the fire.

It was reported that the hotel was probably packed with guests due to its clear view of the New Year's fireworks display at Jumeirah Beach (including Burj Al Arab) and Burj Khalifa. The show still went on as planned, but with some flaws in the LED programming; by midnight, authorities had deemed the fire to be 90 percent contained. The following day, smoke continued to rise from the building. Criticism was leveled towards the high amount of cladding—layers of material that are fixed to the outside of buildings for insulation—implemented into the building's design; it was reported that this cladding may have contributed to the fire's spread.

On 20 January 2016, Dubai Police held a news conference to confirm that the fire was caused by an electrical short circuit. The forensic investigation has identified that the short circuit was caused by electrical wires of the spotlight used to illuminate the building between the 14th and the 15th floor. After the onsite investigation, experts identified that the fire broke out in the duct between flat numbers 1401 and 1504. Experts have conducted further investigation in flat number 1504 and have drawn conclusion that the fire spread to the unit from the side of the window, which is connected to the ledge and the falling debris caused the fire in flat number 1401. The police released photographs during the news conference which show the exposed unconnected wire in the duct between the two apartments. The fire was first reported by a guest who was residing on the 18th floor of the building where he called the reception to inform that he could smell something burning and visited the reception minutes later after he began to notice the smoke.

Emaar provided housing for those whose apartments were affected by the fire, but some residents complained that the housing was inferior to that they had lost. Hotel guests are still waiting to be compensated for the lost items and trauma suffered as a result of the fire. They cannot obtain a precise update from the hotel group nearly 2 years after the fire.

In late 2016, renovation on the tower had started, and while the re-construction was going on, another building under construction within Downtown Dubai, caught fire. The fire was extinguished but, the smoke kept on rising and plumed across Downtown Dubai. Re-construction, installation of safety features and renovation of the Address Downtown Hotel had been completed in 2018.

See also
 List of buildings in Dubai
List of tallest buildings in Dubai

Notes

References

External links

SkyscraperPage.com forum
Official Website 
Gateway to Downtown Dubai
Rove Downtown

Hotels in Dubai
The Address Hotels + Resorts
Residential skyscrapers in Dubai
Residential buildings completed in 2008
Condo hotels
2008 establishments in the United Arab Emirates